The 2022 Copa Federación de España was the 30th edition of the Copa Federación de España, also known as Copa RFEF, a knockout competition for Spanish football clubs.

The competition began in August with the first games of the Regional stages and ended 2 November with the final of the National tournament. As part of the new competition format started in 2019, the four semifinalists qualified for the Copa del Rey first round.

Regional tournaments

Andalusia tournament
The Royal Andalusian Football Federation (RFAF) decided to create the 'Copa RFAF' in 2020. The finalists of this competition were selected as the Andalusian representatives in the national phase of Copa RFEF.

Final

Aragon tournament
Eight teams joined the tournament: Atlético Monzón (5), Barbastro (5), Binéfar (5), Brea (4), Calamocha (5), Caspe (5), Cuarte (5) and Ejea (5). The group phase started 14 August.

Group 1

Group 2

Final

Asturias tournament
12 teams joined the tournament. The draw was made 15 July and the tournament started 7 August.

Group stage

Group A

Group B

Group C

Group D

Knockout stage
The knockout stage matches will be played at Las Tolvas Stadium, in Laviana.

Final

Balearic Islands tournament
Llosetense (5) and Platges de Calvià (5) joined the tournament.

Basque Country tournament
Leioa (5) and Real Unión (3) joined the tournament.

Canary Islands tournament
Gran Tarajal (5), Herbania (6), Mensajero (5), Panadería Pulido (5) and Unión Viera (6) joined the tournament.

Final

Cantabria tournament
Eight teams joined the tournament. All matches were played in San Francisco Stadium, Reinosa.

Final

Castile-La Mancha tournament
Ten teams (Azuqueca (5), Calvo Sotelo (5), Conquense (5), Marchamalo (5), Socuéllamos (4), Talavera de la Reina (4), Toledo (5), Torrijos (5), Villarrobledo (5) and Villarrubia (5)) joined the XXI Trofeo Junta de Comunidades de Castilla-La Mancha, acting also as the regional Copa RFEF tournament.

Final

Castile and León tournament
Arandina (5), Atlético Bembibre (5), Cultural Leonesa (3), Salamanca (5), Santa Marta  (5), Unionistas (3) and Zamora (4) joined the tournament.

Final

Catalonia tournament
Badalona (5) and Terrassa (4) played the tournament.

Ceuta tournament
Betis de Hadú was directly selected by Federación de Fútbol de Ceuta due to sporting merits.

Extremadura tournament
8 teams registered for the tournament: Azuaga (5), Don Álvaro (5), Fuente de Cantos (5), Montehermoso (5), Plasencia (5), Trujillo (5), Villafranca (5) and Villanovense (4).

Final

Galicia tournament
A total of 8 teams joined the tournament.

Final

La Rioja tournament
Casalarreina (5), La Calzada (5), Náxara (5) and Varea (5) joined the tournament.

Final

Madrid tournament
6 teams joined the tournament: Alcalá (5), Internacional (3), Móstoles URJC (5), San Sebastián de los Reyes (3), Torrejón (5) and Ursaria (5).

Group A

Group B

Final

Melilla tournament
Melilla was directly selected by Real Federación Melillense de Fútbol due to sporting merits.

Murcia tournament
Four teams joined the tournament.

Final

Navarre tournament
Eight teams joined the tournament.

Final

Valencian Community tournament
6 teams joined the tournament: Alcoyano (3), Alzira (4), Atzeneta (5), Benigànim (6), Orihuela (5) and Silla (5).

Group A

Group B

Final

National phase
National phase will be played between 28 September and 2 November with 32 teams (20 winners of the Regional Tournaments, the best 5 teams from 2021–22 Segunda División RFEF not yet qualified to 2022–23 Copa del Rey and the best 7 teams from 2021–22 Tercera División RFEF not yet qualified to 2022–23 Copa del Rey). The four semifinalists will qualify to 2022–23 Copa del Rey first round.

Qualified teams

5 best teams from 2021–22 Segunda División RFEF not yet qualified to 2022–23 Copa del Rey
 Bergantiños (4)
 Formentera (4)
 Izarra (4)
 Mar Menor (4)
 San Roque Lepe (4)

7 best teams from 2021–22 Tercera División RFEF not yet qualified to 2022–23 Copa del Rey
 Anguiano (5)
 Illescas (5)
 Illueca (5)
 Moralo (5)
 Poblense (5)
 Somozas (5)
 Xerez (5)

Winners of Autonomous Communities tournaments
 Alcalá (5)
 Alzira (4)
 Arenteiro (4)
 Atlético Monzón (5)
 Avilés (4)
 Betis de Hadú (6)
 Huarte (5)
 Lorca (5)
 Marbella (5)
 Melilla (4)
 Naval (5)
 Náxara (5)
 Panadería Pulido (5)
 Platges de Calvià (5)
 Puente Genil (5)
 Real Unión (3)
 Terrassa (4)
 Trujillo (5)
 Villarrubia (5)
 Zamora (4)

Draw
The draw for the entire tournament was made at the RFEF headquarters on 15 September. The teams were divided into four pots based on geographical criteria. Each pot will be played independently until the semi-finals.

Bracket

Round of 32
Pot A

Pot B

Pot C

Pot D

Round of 16
Pot A

Pot B

Pot C

Pot D

Quarter-finals
Winners will qualify to the 2022–23 Copa del Rey first round.
Pot A

Pot B

Pot C

Pot D

Semi-finals

Final

References

Copa Federación de España seasons
2022–23 in Spanish football cups